The Old Cariboo Highway is a portion of the historic Cariboo Highway near Prince George, British Columbia.  It runs northward from its junction with Highway 97 just south of Prince George, and terminates at the Yellowhead Highway just east of Prince George. It is formerly signed as Highway 97A.

Traffic along the Old Cariboo Highway is light and it serves primarily as the main road for the Pineview area of Prince George, passing next to Pineview Elementary School and the Prince George Airport.

See also
Cariboo Highway
Cariboo Road
Old Cariboo Road

References

Transport in Prince George, British Columbia
Roads in British Columbia
Historic trails and roads in British Columbia
Former British Columbia provincial highways